Paremhat 17 - Coptic Calendar - Paremhat 19

The eighteenth day of the Coptic month of Paremhat, the seventh month of the Coptic year. In common years, this day corresponds to March 14, of the Julian Calendar, and March 27, of the Gregorian Calendar. This day falls in the Coptic Season of Shemu, the season of the Harvest.

Commemorations

Martyrs 

 The martyrdom of Saint Isidore, the friend of Saint Sina the Soldier

References 

Days of the Coptic calendar